Third Album is an album by Shocking Blue, released in 1971. Despite the title, it the group's fourth overall, but their third with singer Mariska Veres.

Track listing

Personnel
Shocking Blue
 Mariska Veres - lead vocals
 Robbie van Leeuwen - guitar, banjo, mandolin, sitar, backing vocals, lead vocals on "I Saw Your Face"
 Cor van der Beek - drums, percussion
 Klaasje van der Wal - bass guitar
 Leo van de Ketterij - guitar

References

1971 albums
Shocking Blue albums